A yacht  is a sailing or power vessel used for pleasure, cruising, or racing. There is no standard definition, though the term generally applies to vessels with a cabin intended for overnight use.

Such yachts typically require a hired crew and have higher construction standards. Further classifications for large yachts are: —carrying no more than 12 passengers, —solely for the pleasure of the owner and guests, or by flag, the country under which it is registered.

Racing yachts are designed to emphasize performance over comfort. Charter yachts are run as a business for profit. As of 2020 there were more than 15,000 yachts of sufficient size to require a professional crew.

Etymology 

The term, yacht, originates from the Dutch word jacht (pl. jachten, which means "hunt"), and originally referred to light, fast sailing vessels that the Dutch Republic navy used to pursue pirates and other transgressors around and into the shallow waters of the Low Countries.

History
The history of pleasure boats begins with rowed craft in Pharaonic Egyptian times, and other vessels in the waters of Burma, India, Mindanao and Japan. It described 8th-century Anglo-Saxon royal pleg-scips (play ships) that featured ornamented bows and sterns and which had the capability of cooking on board.

Sail

The history of sailing yachts begins in Europe in the beginning of the 1600s with the building of a pleasure vessel for the son of King James I of England. While other monarchs used naval ships for transportation and conquest, James I was the first English monarch to commission the construction of a yacht—for his son Henry, Prince of Wales in the early 1600s.  Pleasure vessels acquired the name yacht after the time of Charles II, who spent time exiled in Europe and visited the Netherlands, where a variety of jachten were already well developed as pleasure boats for the elite classes since the beginning of the 17th century. Upon his restoration to the English crown, Charles commissioned a series of royal yachts, which included at least one experimental catamaran. The first recorded yacht race between two vessels occurred in 1661, followed by the first open sailing competition in 1663 in English waters.

Starting in 1739, England found itself in a series of wars—a period that saw a decline in yachting. In Ireland, however, the gentry enjoyed yachting and founded the first yacht club in Cork as the Cork Harbour Water Club in 1720. English yacht racing continued among the English gentry who founded England's oldest yacht club in 1775 to support a fleet at Cumberland. With maritime peace, starting in 1815, came a resurgence of interest in yachting. Boatbuilders, who had been making fast vessels both for smugglers and the government revenue cutters, turned their skills again to yachts.

The fast yachts of the early 19th century were fore-and-aft luggers, schooners, and sloops. By the 1850s, yachts featured large sail areas, a narrow beam, and a deeper draft than was customary until then. Racing between yachts owned by wealthy patrons was common, with large wagers at stake. The America's Cup arose out of a contest between the yacht, America, and its English competitors. Both countries had rules by which to rate yachts, the English by tonnage and the American by length.

In the late 19th century, a yacht owner would base their choice of vessels upon preferred lifestyle and budget, which would determine the size and type of vessel, which would most likely be a fore-and aft, two-masted sailing vessel. A treatise on the subject, A Manual of Yacht and Boat Sailing, provided detailed information on selecting, equipping, sailing, seamanship, management of the paid crew, and racing such vessels. It included a brief section on steam yachts, the recirculating coil steam engine just having made such yachts efficient enough for leisure travel on the water.

Power

While sailing yachts continued to exist, the development of reliable power plants created a new category of pleasure craft. The power plants started with the steam engine and transitioned to the internal combustion engine. Whereas sailing yachts continued to be steered from the after portion of the vessel, power yachts adopted the bridge in a forward cabin structure that afforded better forward and sideways visibility.

Steam 
The history of steam yachts starts with large sailing yachts with a steam auxiliary engine. Early examples, driven with paddle wheels, had a railed platform from which the person conning the vessel could walk across the vessel above the main deck, the origin of the bridge. In the late 18th century, steam engines became more efficient, spars were removed and screw propellers became standard. Large steam yachts were luxurious; their staff included a captain, engineer, and stewards, as well as deck hands.

The development of the steam engine figured in yacht design. In England, the practice was to use fire-tube boilers wherein the hot gases of combustion ran through parallel tubes surrounded by water; a design that required a slow process of heating the water to avoid damaging the boiler before making steam. In the United States, the practice was to use water-tube boilers, wherein the water is surrounded by the hot gases of combustion, allowing for making steam more rapidly. While the boiler was the source of steam, the marine steam engine is where the steam was converted to mechanical power. With smaller, more rapidly spinning propellers engines comprised cylinders with pistons, connected to a crank shaft, driven by steam.

Near the end of the 19th century, compound engines came into widespread use. Compound engines exhausted steam into successively larger cylinders to accommodate the higher volumes at reduced pressures, giving improved efficiency. These stages were called expansions, with double- and triple-expansion engines being common, especially in shipping where efficiency was important to reduce the weight of coal carried. Steam engines remained the dominant source of power until the early 20th century, when advances in the design of the steam turbine, electric motors and internal combustion engines gradually resulted in the replacement of reciprocating (piston) steam engines.

Internal combustion 
Nicolaus Otto and Gottlieb Daimler developed practical four-stroke gasoline engines, starting in 1876. Some were destined for speedboats, other for motor yachts. Diesel power plants for boats were demonstrated in 1903. Diesels became a more prevalent type of power plant in the 20th century thanks to their low cost of operation and reliability.

Classification

The Recreational Craft Directive requires that all vessels sold in the European Union and United Kingdom satisfy one of four design categories, based on the wind force and seas that they are designed to encounter:

  yachts are fit for conditions that exceed wind force 8——and  maximum wave heights, encountered in ocean passages and extended voyages.
  yachts are fit for conditions that are less than wind force 8——and  maximum wave heights, encountered in ocean passages and extended voyages.
  yachts are fit for wind force 6——and  maximum wave heights, encountered in exposed coastal waters, bays inlets, lakes and rivers.
  yachts are fit for wind force 4——and  maximum wave heights, encountered in sheltered coastal waters, bays inlets, lakes and rivers.

The code regulates the equipping of such vessels, both at sea and in port—including such matters as crew duty times and the presence of a helicopter on board. The code has different levels of standard for vessels above and below 500 gross tons. Other countries have standards similar to LY2.

Whereas   large yachts may carry no more than 12 passengers,   yachts are solely for the pleasure of the owner and guests do not carry the passenger restriction. Yachts may be identified by flag—the country under which a yacht is registered. An industry publication categorizes superyachts by size, by speed, as "explorer" yachts, as sailing yachts, and classic yachts.

Construction 
Originally, all yachts were made of wood, using a wooden keel and ribs, clad with planks. These materials were supplanted with iron or steel in steam yachts. In the 1960s fiberglass became a prevalent material. These materials and others continue in use.

 Wood construction, using conventional planks over ribs continues. Hard-chined boats made with plywood is an infrequent technique, whereas yachts made with the WEST system—plies of wood strips, soaked in epoxy and applied over the boat frame—provide a durable, lightweight and robust hull.
 Metal hulls from steel or aluminum offer the opportunity for welding components to a completely watertight hull. Both metals are vulnerable to damage due to electrolysis. Steel is easy to repair in boatyards around the world, whereas aluminum is a much lighter material.
 Fiberglass construction is best suited for mass-produced yachts, using a mold and is therefore the most prevalent material. Fiberglass skins comprise plies of roving (glass fabric) and matting, soaked in resin for the hull. Decks typically have a core of balsa or PVC foam between layers of glass mat. Both elements of construction are vulnerable to intrusion of water and the development of blisters below the waterline.

Accommodations 

Depending on size, a cruising yacht is likely to have at least two cabins, a main salon and a forward stateroom. In smaller yachts, the salon is likely to have convertible berths for its crew or passengers. Typically the salon includes a dining area, which may have a folding, built-in table. The salon is typically contiguous to the galley. A cruising yacht is likely to have a head (bathroom) with a marine toilet that discharges waste into a holding tank. Larger yachts may have additional staterooms and heads. There is typically a navigation station that allows planning the route.

Systems 

Onboard systems include:

 Electrical power, provided by batteries recharged by a motor-driven alternator (sail) or by a generator set (motor)
 Water, stored in on-board tanks, refilled on shore or replenished with a desalination water maker
 Sanitation, provided by toilets using seawater and discharged into holding tanks.
 Refrigeration by ice or an engine-driven mechanical system.

Modern yachts employ a suite of electronics for communication, measurement of surroundings, and navigation.

 Communications equipment includes radios in a variety of bandwidths, specifically for maritime use.
 Instrumentation also provides information on depth of water under the vessel (depth sounder), windspeed (anemometer), and directional orientation (compass).
 Navigation electronics include units that identify a vessel's location (e.g. GPS) and display the vessel's location (chartplotter) and other vessels and nearby shore (radar).

Sailing yachts

Sailing yachts for cruising versus racing embody different tradeoffs between comfort and performance. Cruising yachts emphasize comfort over performance. Racing yachts are designed to compete against others in their class, while providing adequate comfort to their crews.

Cruising
Cruising yachts may be designed for near-shore use or for passage-making. They may also be raced, but they are designed and built with the comfort and amenities necessary for overnight voyages. Qualities considered in cruising yachts include: performance, comfort under way, ease of handling, stability, living comfort, durability, ease of maintenance, affordability of ownership.

Categories 
Cruising sailboats share the common attribute of providing overnight accommodations. They may be classified as small (easy to haul behind a trailer), near-shore and off-shore. Multihull sailing yachts are a category, apart.

Small yachts are typically shorter than  length overall.
Near-shore yachts typically range in size from  length overall.
Offshore yachts typically exceed  length overall.

Design 

Design considerations for a cruising yacht include seaworthiness, performance, sea kindliness, and cost of construction, as follows:

 Seaworthiness addresses the integrity of the vessel and its ability to stay afloat and shelter its crew in the conditions encountered.
 Performance hinges on a number of factors, including the waterline length (longer means faster), drag in the water (narrower hull with smooth appendages), hull shape, and sail shape and area.
 Sea kindliness is an indicator of steering ease, directional stability and quelling of motion induced by wind and waves.

Multihulls offer tradeoffs as cruising sailboats, compared with monohulls. They may be catamarans or trimarans. They rely on form stability—having separate hulls far apart—for their resistance to capsize. Their advantages include greater: stability, speed, (for catamarans) living space, and shallower draft. Their drawbacks include: greater expenses, greater windage, more difficult tacking under sail, less load capacity, and more maneuvering room required because of their broad beam. They come with a variety of sleeping accommodations and (for catamarans) bridge-deck configurations.

Rigs 
Gaff rigs have been uncommon in the construction of cruising boats, since the mid 20th century. More common rigs are Bermuda, fractional, cutter, and ketch. Occasionally employed rigs since then have been the yawl, schooner, wishbone, catboat.

Gear 
Sailboats employ standing rigging to support the rig, running rigging to raise and adjust sails, cleats to secure lines, winches to work the sheets, and more than one anchor to secure the boat in harbor. A cruising yacht's deck usually has safety line to protect the crew from falling overboard and a bow pulpit to facilitate handling the jib and the anchor. In temperate climates, the cockpit may have a canvas windshield with see-through panels, called a "dodger". Steering may be either by tiller or wheel.

Engine 
Cruising yachts have an auxiliary propulsion power unit to supplement the use of sails. Such power is inboard on the vessel and diesel, except for the smallest cruising boats, which may have an outboard gasoline motor. A   sailboat might have a  engine, whereas a  sailboat might have a  engine.

Racing

Racing yachts emphasize performance over comfort. World Sailing recognizes eleven classes of racing yacht.

Design features 
High-performance rigs provide aerodynamic efficiency and hydrodynamically efficient hulls minimize drag through the water and sideways motion.

Racing yachts have a wide selection of weights and shapes of sail to accommodate different wind strengths and points of sail. A suite of sails on a racing yachts would include several weights of jib and spinnaker, plus a specialized storm jib and trysail (in place of the mainsail). Performance yachts are likely to have full-battened kevlar or carbon-fiber mainsails.

Underwater foils can become more specialized, starting with a higher-aspect ratio fin keel with hydrodynamically efficient bulbs for ballast. On some racing yachts, a canting keel shifts angle from side to side to promote sailing with less heeling angle (sideway tilt), while other underwater foils take care of leeway (sideways motion).

Motor yachts 

They also vary by use, by style, and by hull type. As of April 2020 a  yacht, REV Ocean, was under construction, which when launched would replace the  Azzam as the longest superyacht. As superyachts have grown size, the distinction between a yacht and a ship (perhaps converted for personal use) has become unclear. A proposed definition for calling a vessel a yacht rather than a ship would if it was constructed solely for personal use and has a combined occupancy of less than 100, including crew.

Classification

Class A: motorboats less than 
Class 1: motorboats 
Class 2: motorboats 
Class 3: motorboats

Style
A motor yacht's style can both be functional and evoke an aesthetic—trending towards the modern or the traditional. Among the styles, mentioned in the literature, are:

 Cruiser – A cruiser has a displacement hull for economical, long-distance passage-making.
 Sports cruiser – A sports cruiser has a semi-displacement or planing hull for fast trips.
 Sports fisherman – A sports fisherman has a semi-displacement or planing hull for fast trips and carries gear for recreational catching of large fish.
 Expedition –An expedition yacht has a displacement hull for economical, long-distance passage-making to remote destinations. These are also called   yachts.
 Lobster – A lobster yacht is styled like a Maine lobster boat and has a semi-displacement or planing hull for fast trips.
 Trawler– A trawler has conservative, traditional styling and has a displacement hull for economical, medium-distance passage-making.

Hulls

 Full-displacement hulls move the water up and out of the way of the vessel, making a wave. They are limited in speed by the square root of the waterline length multiplied by a factor, depending on the units used. Added horsepower cannot increase the maximum speed, only the size of the waves produced. 
 Semi-displacement hulls allow speeds that are faster than the hull speed of a displacement vessel because they rise somewhat out of the water and create smaller waves. They also provide greater comfort than planing hulls.
 Planing hulls require sufficient power for the boat to slide up onto the surface, which avoids the need to use power to lift water out of the way of the vessel. Such vessels have flat surfaces on the undersides.

A typical semi-displacement yacht has a wedge-shaped bow, which promotes penetrating waves, that transitions to flatter, wider surfaces aft, which promotes lifting the vessel out of the water—the "deep vee" hull, designed by Ray Hunt, found in approximately 75% of modern power boats.

Engines

Motor yachts typically have one or more diesel engines. Gasoline-powered motors and engines are the provenance of outboard motors and racing boats, due to their power-to-weight ratios. Two engines add expense, but provide reliability and maneuverability over a single engine.

Motor yachts in the  range might have the following hull, horsepower, cruise speed, and hourly fuel consumption characteristics:

Superyachts may employ multiple  diesels or a combination of diesels and gas turbines with a combined .

See also 

 World Sailing
 List of keelboat classes designed before 1970
 List of large sailing yachts
 List of motor yachts by length
 List of sailing boat types
 List of sailboat designers and manufacturers
 Model yachting
 Superyacht
 Yacht broker
 Yacht charter
 Yacht racing
 Yacht transport
 Yacht tender
 Yacht support vessel
 Yachting

References

External links

Yachts
Dutch inventions
Ship designs of the Dutch Republic